See List of fortifications for a list of notable fortified structures. 
For city walls in particular, see List of cities with defensive walls.

Pre-modern fortifications

  The Great Wall of China, China – part of UNESCO site 438,. This is mostly referred to the Ming Great Wall, built from 1368 to 1644, measures 8,850 km long.
  Great Wall of Qi, the oldest of the Chinese Great Walls. 
  Great Wall of Yan (state) 
  Great Wall of Zhongshan (state) 
  Great Wall of Zhao (state)  
  Great Wall of Qin dynasty 
  Great Wall of Han dynasty (206 BC–220 AD), the longest Great Wall in history. 
  Great Wall of Northern Wei dynasty 
  Great Wall of Northern Qi dynasty 
  Great Wall of the Jurchen Jin Dynasty (1115–1234), built to defend against northern nomadic tribes, once spanning over 2,500 kilometers long.
  Great Wall of Western Xia 
  Great Wall of the Khitan Liao dynasty 
  Walls of Constantinople in Turkey
  Anastasian Wall in Turkey
  Antonine Wall in Scotland, United Kingdom – part of UNESCO site 430
  Aurelian Walls of Rome
  Walls of Ston in Croatia
  Ranikot Fort, Also called 'The Great Wall of Pakistan', second largest wall of South Asia after Kumbhalgarh fort in India
  Cheolli Jangseong, North Korea and China
  Danevirke, Germany
  Fossatum Africae
  Roman limes in Upper Germania, Lower Germania and Rhaetia, Germany - part of UNESCO site 430
  Great Wall of Gorgan in Iran, (World's second longest wall)
  Hadrian's Wall in England – part of UNESCO site 430
  Long Wall (Thracian Chersonese)
  Offa's Dyke between Mercia (England) and Powys (Wales)
  Serpent's Wall, the ancient walls in Ukraine
  Wall of Severus, between Roman Britain and [not recorded]
  Silesia Walls, Poland
  The Wall, built during 800–1000 AD in Ijebu Ode in Ogun State, southwest Nigeria 
  Great Wall of Tlaxcala, mentioned in the history of Bernal Díaz del Castillo
  Trajan's Wall, in Dobruja, Romania
  Athanaric's Wall, Romania
  Wat's Dyke parallel, for part of the distance, to Offa's Dyke, England:Wales.
  Long Wall of Quảng Ngãi in Quảng Ngãi, Vietnam.
  Kumbalgarh Fort wall Udaipur in Rajasthan, world's  second longest & largest wall.

Modern defensive walls or border barriers

   Atlantic Wall in Nazi-occupied France
   Berlin Wall in Berlin separating West Berlin from East Germany 1961–1989 (in concrete: 1975–1989)
  Inland Customs Line 2,500 miles (4,000 km) built 1843 onward in British India 
  India–Pakistan barrier
  Bangladesh–India border 
  Sections of the Israeli West Bank barrier, West Bank
  Sections of the Blue Line between Lebanon and Israel
  Belfast Peace Lines in Belfast, Northern Ireland, UK 
  Korean Wall (alleged by DPRK), Korean Demilitarized Zone
  Ceuta border fence, in Ceuta, Autonomous city of Spain
  Melilla border fence in Melilla, Autonomous city of Spain
  US-Mexico Border
  Frontier Closed Area along Hong Kong-China border
  Hungary-Serbia Barrier
  Turkey-Syria Barrier
  Turkey-Iran Barrier
  Slovenian border Barrier
  Pakistan–Afghanistan barrier
   Myanmar-Bangladesh Border Fence
  India–Myanmar Barrier
  Moroccan Western Sahara Wall, in Western Sahara
  Poland–Belarus barrier

Memorial walls
  Communards' Wall in the Père Lachaise Cemetery, in Paris, France
  Democracy Wall, in Beijing (1978–1979)
  Lennon Wall in Prague
  Vietnam Veterans Memorial, often called the Wall, in Washington, D.C.
  Pine Grove Cemetery, second-longest contiguous stone wall in the world, in Lynn, Massachusetts
  Lennon Wall in Hong Kong

Walls in contemporary art and sports
 Die Gelbe Wand, Westfalenstadion in Dortmund
 Green Monster, Fenway Park, Boston
 Tsoi Wall in Arbat Street, Moscow
 The Wall in SoHo, New York City
 The Wall In Concert (theatrical) - While based on a figment of a main character's imagination, the concerts in the tour for the Pink Floyd album The Wall featured a real wall of giant cardboard bricks between the band and the audience which was constructed, completed, spoliated and finally destroyed during the course of each show.

See also
 Gum Wall
 Separation barrier
 List of cities with defensive walls
 List of town walls in England and Wales
 List of fortifications
 Great Wall (astronomy)
 List of Egyptian castles, forts, fortifications and city walls

References

Lists of buildings and structures
Structural system